Dusk and Summer is the fourth studio album by American rock band Dashboard Confessional.

Background
With the release of A Mark, a Mission, a Brand, a Scar (2003), Dashboard Confessional solidified its line-up of vocalist/guitarist Chris Carrabba, bassist Scott Schoenbeck, guitarist John Lefler and drummer Mike Marsh. The album charted at number two on the Billboard 200 and its single "Hands Down" reached number eight on the Alternative Songs chart. The group contributed the track "Vindicated", which was produced by Don Gilmore, to the Spider-Man 2 soundtrack released in June 2004. Later that month, a live recording of a new track "So Long, So Long" appeared on the group's website. The track marked a change from their past work as it included a piano. Carrabba said the next album would be a piano-driven effort with contributions from the other members. Following this, Carrabba spent the rest of the summer writing material for a new album.

In December, the group got together and played through the songs they had. Though Carrabba considered a lot of it unsatisfactory, he figured out the vibe for the next album: "I have this passionate desire to sort of explore space ... [as opposed to] compounding everything into these driving parts."  In February 2005, Carrabba scrapped an album's worth of songs as he felt they were too safe: "[F]ans probably would have liked those songs. And people who weren't would have had the same complaints as ever." Carrabba spent two weeks in Florida making several batches of demos of over 30 songs. He rediscovered the material he had written for his previous bands Further Seems Forever and The Vacant Andies, and decided to write tracks that combined elements from them and Dashboard. After another four weeks, he had written a whole new album.

Production
Through a mutual friend, some of the demos ended up in the hands of producer Daniel Lanois. The demos inspired him to come out of retirement, which he had been in since working on All That You Can't Leave Behind (2000) by U2. Despite having already having plans to record, Carrabba was invited to Jamaica, where Lanois was, to discuss the songs. He flew out and the pair spent a week talking about songs. A day after returning home, Lanois was interested in producing the album. In April, the group worked with Lanois and recorded 20 songs. Half of them at Lanois' home in Toronto, Canada, and the other half at Lanois' other home in Silver Lake, California. Sessions also took place at NRG, Avatar, Pilot, Mission Sound, Quad Studios, The Loft and La Bella Vista. Mark Kiczula acted as the main engineer with assistance from Jim Keller, Chad Lupo, Guiliano Baglioni, Roberto Fulps and Matt Shane. Additional engineering was done by Fox Phelps, Adam Samuels and Daniel Mendez.

Carrabba experimented with a variety of instruments from mandolins to metal flowers pots that substituted as drums. At the end of the month, Carrabba went on a solo tour of colleges and debuted some of the new songs. In September, the group supported U2 on their North American tour. In between these support dates, the group performed a few club shows. Prior to starting the tour, Carrabba said the album required mixing. Despite this, material was still being recorded up to January 2006. Lanois left the project; Carrabba wanted to record another track, at which point Gilmore was brought in. Carrabba subsequently went on a song writing binge, creating six songs across four days. Sometime afterwards, Carrabba decided to rework the Lanois-produced material with Gilmore, while retaining some of Lanois' contributions. In March, Gilmore and Carrabba recorded an album's worth of songs.

Gilmore is credited as producing the majority of the album, with the exception of "Heaven Here" which is credited to him and Lanois. Lanois also received a producer credit for the vocals on "Reason to Believe". Marsh said that due to the structure of the songs and melodies, the recording process give him a "great opportunity to create space." Andy Wallace mixed all of the album, except for "Don't Wait" (mixed by Gilmore), at Soundtrack Studios in New York City. He was aided by Pro Tools engineer John O'Mahony and assisted by Mike Scielzi, Paul Suarez ad Jan Petrov. Ted Jensen mastered the recordings at Sterling Sound. Adam Duritz of Counting Crows provided additional vocals on "So Long, So Long", while Susan Sherouse contributed violin and vocals. Carrabba had met Duritz while the pair were playing at a benefit concert.

Composition
Discussing the album title, Carrabba and his family used to drive an hour and sit on a beach. Eventually, he "just kept finding myself back there, finding inspiration." Musically, Dusk and Summer has been described as arena rock,pop rock and emo channelling the guitarwork of U2 guitarist the Edge, and the vocal wailing of the Cure frontman Robert Smith. The song arrangements build on the rock sound of A Mark, a Mission, a Brand, a Scar and Carrabba's former band Further Seems Forever, incorporating more piano and violin parts, recalling the work of Coldplay and Journey. The Sixpence None the Richer-esque track "Don't Wait" was written in a dressing room on the U2 tour. It was completed within in a few minutes; he said it talked about "seizing and acting on what you dream, not just dreaming about it." "Stolen" tackles the theme of unrequited love, while "So Long, So Long" is a piano-centric track about leaving one's hometown. "Slow Decay" is about a soldier readjusting to home life after returning from war. It was based on two friends of Carrabba's and a third person, who he witnessed on 60 Minutes. His vocal was reminiscent of My Chemical Romance frontman Gerard Way. "Dusk and Summer" was written at the eleventh hour and summarised all of the parts of the album; it recalled the group's earlier material. "Heaven Here" wasn't intended for inclusion on the record until Lanois heard it and convinced Carrabba to write lyrics for it.

Release

On April 8, 2006, the group's next album was announced for release in June and the track listing was revealed. On May 5, the album's title was announced as Dusk and Summer. Around this time, a music video was filmed for "Don't Wait" in California with director Rich Lee. The video features Fernanda Romero and Carrabba; Carrabba makes a choice and breaks up with her, before he is pulled "at light-speed through time, almost to the end of the world". Throughout the video, he realizes his mistake and is taken back to undo what he did. The track was available to download from their website on May 18, before being released to radio on May 23. Following this, they appeared at the HFStival and did an AOL Session, where they performed "Don't Wait". A music video for "Don't Wait" was released on June 6. Dusk and Summer was made available for streaming via AOL on June 26, 2006, before being released a day later through Vagrant Records.

The Target edition included a DVD, which featured three live performances and an interview. In early July, the band went on a tour of Canada with Say Anything and Ben Lee, followed by a US tour running into August. "Rooftops and Invitations" was released to radio on August 29. The group went on a European tour, before embarking on a tour of Australia. Following this, they appeared at the Bamboozle Left festival. From mid-October to early December 2006, the band went on a US tour alongside Brand New. On December 11, 2006, the band appeared on Late Night with Conan O'Brien; they also featured on Loaded on February 7, 2007. Dusk and Summer was reissued on May 22, 2007. This edition included a new version of "Stolen", "Vindicated" and live versions of "Ghost of a Good Thing" and "The Best Deceptions". It was promoted with an appearance on The Tonight Show with Jay Leno. "Stolen" was released in Australia as a CD single on July 25, which featured two versions of "Stolen", and a cover of "In a Big Country" by Big Country.

Reception

Dusk and Summer debuted at number 2 on the Billboard 200 chart, selling 134,000 copies in its first week. By August 2006, the album had sold over 300,000 copies.

Track listing
All songs written by Chris Carrabba.

 "Write It Out" – 4:51 (pregap hidden track)
 "Vindicated" – 3:20 (pregap hidden track)
 "Don't Wait" – 4:05
 "Reason to Believe" – 3:43
 "The Secret's in the Telling" – 3:24
 "Stolen" – 3:53
 "Rooftops and Invitations" – 3:54
 "So Long, So Long" – 4:15
 "Currents" – 4:27
 "Slow Decay" – 4:08
 "Dusk and Summer" – 4:38
 "Heaven Here" – 4:08

Personnel
Personnel per booklet.

Dashboard Confessional
 Chris Carrabba – lead vocals, guitar, keys
 Scott Schoenbeck – bass
 John Lefler – lead guitar, keys
 Mike Marsh – drums, percussion

Additional musicians
 Adam Duritz – additional vocals (track 6)
 Susan Sherouse – violin, vocals

Production
 Don Gilmore – producer, mixing (track 1)
 Andy Wallace – mixing
 Daniel Lanois – vocal producer (track 2), producer (track 10)
 Mark Kiczula – engineer
 Fox Phelps – additional engineer
 Adam Samuels – additional engineer
 Daniel Mendez – additional engineer
 Jim Keller – assistant engineer
 Chad Lupo – assistant engineer
 Guiliano Baglioni – assistant engineer
 Roberto Fulps – assistant engineer
 Matt Shane – assistant engineer
 John O'Mahony – mix Pro Tools engineer
 Mike Scielzi – mixing assistant
 Paul Suarez – mixing assistant
 Jan Petrov – mixing assistant
 Ted Jensen – mastering
 Marina Chavez – photography
 Blake Sinclair – additional photography
 Ben Goetting – design

Charts

Weekly charts

Year-end charts

References

Dashboard Confessional albums
2006 albums
Albums produced by Daniel Lanois
Vagrant Records albums